The 2005 Team Speedway Junior World Championship was the 1st FIM Team Speedway Junior World Championship season. The Final took place on October 1 2005 in Pardubice, Czech Republic. World Championship was won by Poland team.

Calendar

Qualification

Semifinal 1

Semifinal 2

 August 28, 2005
  Holsted
 Australia was replaced by Denmark B

Semifinal 3

 August 28, 2005
  Rybnik
 France was replaced by Poland B

Final 

 October 1, 2005
  Pardubice

References

See also 
2005 Speedway World Cup

2005
World T J